Bolitophila is the sole living genus in the Bolitophilidae, a family of Diptera in the superfamily Sciaroidea, with around 40 Palaearctic and about 20 Nearctic species, and three species from the Oriental region (Taiwan). They are small (6–9 mm).

Morphology

Biology
The larvae of Bolitophila are mycetophagous and live in decaying wood or other organic debris overgrown by fungal plant substrates. Pupation takes place inside the fungal mycelium in soil or litter. Adults prefer shady and humid environments and can be found in the undergrowth of mixed forests, often near watercourses.

Evolutionary history 
The oldest fossils belonging to Bolitophila are known from the Eocene, with Bolitophila warreni known from the Lutetian aged Kishenehn Formation in Montana and Bolitophila rohdendorfi known from Baltic amber. The closest known relative to Bolitophila  and only other known member of the family is the extinct genus Mangas, known from the Lower Cretaceous (Aptian) aged Gurvan-Eren Formation of Mongolia and the Khasurty locality of Buryatia, Russia.

Species

B. acuta Garrett, 1925
B. affinis Ostroverkhova, 1971
B. alberta Fisher, 1937
B. antennata Ševčik & Papp, 2004
B. aperta Lundström, 1914
B. atlantica Fisher, 1934
B. austriaca (Mayer, 1950)
B. basicornis (Mayer, 1951)
B. bilobata Garrett, 1925
B. bimaculata Zetterstedt, 1838
B. bispinosa Mayer, 1951
B. bucera Shaw, 1940
B. caspersi Plassmann, 1987
B. cinerea Meigen, 1818
B. clavata Garrett, 1925
B. collarti (Tollet, 1943)
B. connectans Garrett, 1925
B. cooremani (Tollet, 1955)
B. coronata Mayer, 1951
B. curviseta Ostroverkhova, 1979
B. disjuncta Loew, 1869
B. distus Fisher, 1937
B. doerrsteini Plassmann, 1988
B. dubia Siebke, 1863
B. dubiosa Van Duzee, 1928
B. duplus Garrett, 1925
B. edwardsiana Stackelberg, 1969
B. exilis (Kovalev, 1986)
B. fumida Edwards, 1941
B. fusca Meigen, 1818
B. glabrata Loew, 1869
B. glabratella Mayer, 1951
B. hybrida (Meigen, 1804)
B. incisa Ostroverkhova & Grishina, 1974
B. ingrica Stackelberg, 1969
B. japonica (Okada, 1934)
B. latipes Tollet, 1943
B. lengersdorfi (Tollet, 1955)
B. leruthi (Tollet, 1955)
B. limitis Polevoi, 1996
B. luteola Plotnikova, 1962
B. maculipennis Mayer, 1951
B. maculipennis Walker, 1835
B. mayeri Plassmann, 1987
B. melanoleuci Polevoi, 1996
B. miki (Mayer, 1950)
B. modesta Lackschewitz, 1937
B. montana Coquillett, 1901
B. nana (Macquart, 1826)
B. nigrolineata Landrock, 1912
B. obscurior Stackelberg, 1969
B. occlusa Edwards, 1913
B. palustris Ostroverkhova, 1979
B. patulosa Garrett, 1925
B. perlata Garrett, 1925
B. plumicornis (Mayer, 1951)
B. pseudohybrida Landrock, 1912
B. raca Garrett, 1925
B. rectangulata Lundström, 1913
B. recurva Garrett, 1925
B. rossica Landrock, 1912
B. saundersii (Curtis, 1836)
B. scherfi Plassmann, 1970
B. sibirica (Ostroverkhova, 1979)
B. simplex Garrett, 1925
B. spelaeicola Tollet, 1955
B. spinigera Edwards, 1925
B. subbimaculata Zaitzev, 1994
B. subteresa (Garrett, 1925)
B. taihybrida Ševčik & Papp, 2004
B. tarsata Mayer, 1951
B. tarsatiformis Ostroverkhova, 1979
B. tenella Winnertz, 1863
B. triangulata Edwards, 1941
B. trullata Lundström, 1916
B. tungusica Ostroverkhova, 1979

References

Further reading
Amorim D. S. & Rindal E., 2007 Phylogeny of the Mycetophiliformia, with proposal of the subfamilies Heterotrichinae, Ohakuneinae, and Chiletrichinae for the Rangomaramidae (Diptera, Bibionomorpha). Zootaxa 1535: 1–92.
Hutson A.M., Ackland, D.M., & Kidd, L.N. (1980) Diptera: Mycetophilidae. Royal Entomological Society of London Handbook 9(3).
Plassmann E., 1988 Bolitophilidae, in Soós A. & Papp L. (eds), Catalogue of Palaearctic Diptera. Volume 3. Ceratopogonidae — Mycetophilidae. Akadémiai Kiadó, Budapest: 193–196.
Séguy,  E. (1940) Diptères: Nématocères. Paris: Éditions Faune de France 36. BibliothequeVirtuelleNumerique
Søli, G.E.E., Vockeroth J.R., & Matile L. (2000) "Families of Sciaroidea." in Papp, L. & Darvas B. (eds) Contributions to a Manual of Palaearctic Diptera (with Special Reference to Flies of Economic Importance). Budapest: Science Herald, pp. 49–92. 
Séguy, E. (1940) Diptères: Nématocères. Paris: Éditions Faune de France 36 BibliothequeVirtuelleNumerique

External links
Fungus gnats online

Sciaroidea
Sciaroidea genera
Kishenehn Formation
Taxa named by Johann Wilhelm Meigen